Defying Destiny is a 1923 American silent drama film directed by Louis Chaudet and starring Monte Blue and Irene Rich.

Cast

Preservation

Defying Destiny was thought to be a lost film until a print was found and repatriated to the George Eastman Museum from New Zealand in 2010 with several other American films.

References

External links

Film Preservation Foundation Defying Destiny

1923 films
American silent feature films
1920s rediscovered films
American black-and-white films
Silent American drama films
1923 drama films
Films directed by Louis Chaudet
Selznick Pictures films
Rediscovered German films
1920s American films